is the 22nd major single by the Japanese female idol group Cute. It was released in Japan on July 10, 2013.

Background 
Both title songs are bittersweet adult-like shōwa era-like songs that were arranged into upbeat dance numbers.

The single will be released in six versions: Limited Editions A, B, C, D and Regiular Editions A, B. The Regular Editions and the Limited Edition D are CD-only. The limited editions A, B, and C include a DVD. All the limited editions are shipped sealed and include a serial-numbered entry card for the lottery to win a ticket to one of the single's launch events.

Track listing

Regular Edition A, Limited Editions A, B, C

Regular Edition B, Limited Edition D

Bonus 
Sealed into all the limited editions:
 Event ticket lottery card with a serial number

Charts 

 First week sales according to Oricon: 60,592 copies

References

External links 
 Profile on the Hello! Project official website
 Profile on the Up-Front Works official website
 Сomment by Tsunku - Tsunku's official blog

2013 singles
Japanese-language songs
Cute (Japanese idol group) songs
Songs written by Tsunku
Song recordings produced by Tsunku
Zetima Records singles
Electronic dance music songs
Japanese synth-pop songs
Dance-pop songs